The Fincha Power Station is a hydroelectric power plant fed through Chomen Lake and discharging into the Fincha River in Ethiopia near the town of Fincha. It has a power generating capacity of  enough wattage to power over 66,900 homes.

See also

 Energy in Ethiopia

References

Fincha
Hydroelectric power stations in Ethiopia
Oromia Region